Jonathan "Jonny" Coyne (born 1 January 1953) is an English actor known for playing Warden Edwin James on Fox's short-lived series, Alcatraz (2012). He also appeared as Dr. Lydgate in Once Upon a Time in Wonderland and Once Upon a Time and recurred as George de Mohrenschildt in 11.22.63.

Early life and education
Coyne's earliest performances were in school plays. He played The Judge in Howard Barker's Hang of the Gaol and Phaeton in Ovid's Chariot of the Sun. When his performances received positive reviews in the national press, he decided to pursue an acting career. He won a place at the Royal Academy of Dramatic Art in London and upon his graduation, he received the Hannam Clarke Award.

Career 
His first role on TV was on an episode of London's Burning in 1990. His next big role was in the mini-series Gulliver's Travels, starring Ted Danson. He appeared in many British TV series over the next few years, including guest appearances on EastEnders, Pulling and The Bill. In 2003, he was cast in Lara Croft: Tomb Raider – The Cradle of Life. In 2010, he was cast in The Nutcracker in 3D.

His biggest role to date was as Warden Edwin James on Alcatraz. He was later cast in Would You Rather and London Boulevard. In 2013, he was cast in the supporting film roles of a henchman in Gangster Squad, and the right-hand man of John Goodman's character in The Hangover Part III.

In 2018, he appeared in the third season of the AMC television series Preacher, in the recurring role of Allfather D'Daronique, which required him to wear a fatsuit.

Filmography

Film

Television

References

External links

TV Guide Bio

1953 births
20th-century births
20th-century English male actors
21st-century English male actors
Alumni of RADA
English expatriates in the United States
English male film actors
English male stage actors
English male television actors
Living people
Place of birth missing (living people)